Independent Democrats ( or NEZDEM) was a small populist political party in the Czech Republic. Its founder Vladimír Železný, MEP, was elected its chairman during the party's convention on 6–7 August 2005. It advocates strict immigration policies, the abolition of the Senate, and review of the country's relationship with the European Union.

References

External links
Official website
 Vladimír Železný (page in European Parliament)

Political parties established in 2005
National conservative parties in the Czech Republic
Libertas.eu
2005 establishments in the Czech Republic
Defunct political parties in the Czech Republic
Populism in the Czech Republic
Eurosceptic parties in the Czech Republic
2015 disestablishments in the Czech Republic
Political parties disestablished in 2015